Desmond Geraghty (born 27 October 1943) is a former Irish politician and trade union leader. He was president of SIPTU from 1999 to 2004. He stood unsuccessfully at the 1984 European Parliament election for the Dublin constituency as a Workers' Party candidate. He briefly served as General Secretary of the Workers' Party from 1991–1992, succeeding Seán Garland and played a prominent role in events leading up to the split in that party. In 1992 Geraghty joined the newly founded Democratic Left party. 

He was appointed to the European Parliament in 1992 for the Dublin constituency following the resignation of Proinsias De Rossa. He was a member of the Committee on Economic and Monetary Affairs and Industrial Policy in the European Parliament. He did not contest the 1994 European Parliament election. He stood unsuccessfully as a Labour Party candidate in the 2002 Seanad election for the Labour Panel.

Geraghty was a member of the board of the Central Bank of Ireland from 2009 to 2019. He is a former member of the RTÉ Board. He has published several books including one about folk singer Luke Kelly. He is also a member of the board of Poetry Ireland.

Bibliography
40 Shades of Green, Des Geraghty, Real Ireland Design, 2007
Luke Kelly: a Memoir, Des Geraghty, Basement Press, 1994,

References

External links

Department of Enterprise, Trade & Employment – Press release

1943 births
Living people
Workers' Party (Ireland) politicians
Democratic Left (Ireland) politicians
Labour Party (Ireland) MEPs
Irish trade unionists
MEPs for the Republic of Ireland 1989–1994
Politicians from County Dublin